Tonyelle Cook-Artis is an American politician from Pennsylvania. She served as a member of the Pennsylvania House of Representatives, representing the 200th House district in Philadelphia, Pennsylvania for one term. In March 2016, she won a special election to complete the term of Cherelle Parker, who resigned from the House to take a seat on the Philadelphia City Council. In April, Chris Rabb defeated her in the Democratic primary election.

References

External links
Official Web Site
PA House profile

Living people
Politicians from Philadelphia
Democratic Party members of the Pennsylvania House of Representatives
African-American state legislators in Pennsylvania
21st-century American politicians
1974 births
21st-century African-American politicians
20th-century African-American people